Ciril is a masculine given name common to Slovenia

People

Ciril Bergles, Slovene poet
Ciril Cvetko, Slovene composer
Ciril Grossklaus, Swiss judoka
Ciril Horjak, Slovene illustrator
Ciril Klinar, Slovenian ice hockey player
Ciril Kotnik, Yugoslav diplomat of Slovene ethnicity
Ciril Metod Koch, Slovene architect
Ciril Kosmač, Slovenian novelist
Ciril Pelhan, Yugoslav swimmer
Ciril Praček, Slovenian skier
Ciril Ribičič, Slovenian jurist
Ciril Zlobec, Slovene poet

See also
Ćiril Ban, Croatian rower

Slovene given names

fr:Ciril